Playing with Dolls is a 2015 American slasher film directed by Rene Perez, co-written by Perez and Barry Massoni. It starred Natasha Blasick, Richard Tyson, Charlie Glackin, Alanna Forte, David A. Lockhart.

Description 
After an unsuccessful run under its original title, in 2017, Lightning Pictures released the DVD in the united Kingdom under the title Leatherface: The Legend Lives On. The new title was criticized as a fraudulent attempt to confuse viewers into thinking that the film was Leatherface, the eighth installment of the Texas Chainsaw Massacre franchise, also released in 2017.

Perez released a statement to the Dread Central site: "I am apposed [sic] to this title change but I am powerless to stop it. I made no money from this sale. The sales agency didn’t even inform me that a sale was made to the UK. I was unaware until I saw this article. At the moment I am making a 3rd Playing with Dolls movie. I will be self releasing the new Playing with Dolls online to avoid any issues like this in the future. Apologies to my fellow horror fans for this title change."

Also known as
 (original title)  Playing with Dolls
 UK (reissue title)  Leatherface: The Legend Lives On
 USA (alternative title)  Metalface

Cast
 Natasha Blasick as Cindy
 Richard Tyson as The Watcher / Scopophilio
 Charlie Glackin as Prisoner AYO-886 / the Killer
 Alanna Forte as Victim Number 1
 David A. Lockhart as Burnett
 Allisun Sturges as the Lawyer

Sequels

A sequel, titled Playing with Dolls: Bloodlust, was released in Germany on January 21, 2016.

A third movie titled Playing with Dolls: Havoc was released on July 18, 2017.

A fourth movie, titled Cry Havoc, was released on May 5, 2020.

References

External links
 
 Playing with Dolls at Filmweb

2015 films
2010s slasher films
2015 horror films
American horror films
Serial killer films
2010s English-language films
2010s American films